The International Railroad for Queer Refugees, formerly known as the Iranian Railroad for Queer Refugees (IRQR), is an advocacy group for LGBT rights in Iran. It was founded and is headed by Executive Director Arsham Parsi. It was set up on behalf of Iranian LGBT persons seeking safe havens both within and outside of Iran. It is the first Iranian NGO in the world, working on behalf of Iranian LGBT people around the globe.

It has its headquarters in Toronto, Ontario, Canada, where the organization is registered as an NGO. IRQR provides assistance with asylum applications, housing, and financial assistance to those in need. It files petitions to governments on behalf of Iranian LGBTQ persons facing deportation back to Iran, where homosexuality is a criminal offense punishable by death. In August 2016, IRQR was granted charitable status by the Canada Revenue Agency. In November 2018, IRQR expanded its services to non-Iranian LGBTs and officially changed its name to the International Railroad for Queer Refugees.

IRQR documents and reports cases of torture, persecution, execution and other human rights violations that occur in Iran on a regular basis; it has helped demonstrate the situation of LGBT persons in Iran. IRQR also aims to educate people who are opposed to homosexuality due to a lack of correct information and sexual education and also to "end the current lack of self-recognition and self-confidence among queer people and to prevent frequent tragedies, such as suicide."

The organization's name is inspired by the Underground Railroad that helped African-Americans escape slavery in the 19th century.

The homepage of IRQR says:When Iranian queer people flee persecution in Iran, they generally go to Turkey. The United Nations High Commission for Refugees interviews these refugees and decides whether their case for asylum is valid. If they are granted asylum status, the UNHCR finds a new country for each person on the base of their profile. IRQR helps these refugees through the process and, whenever possible, provides funds for safe houses from donations, since Turkey is also a homophobic and transphobic society and queer people are not physically safe there either.

In August 2008, Arsham Parsi, the IRQR's Executive Director, met with the office of the United Nations High Commissioner for Refugees (UNHCR) and the Canadian Embassy in Ankara, Turkey, regarding Iranian queer asylum seekers. Since that meeting, a number of asylum seekers have been granted refugee status or have been referred to the Canadian Embassy for their resettlement process. Furthermore, the UNHCR changed their legal interviews to an earlier date.

As of December 2015, IRQR have worked directly with 1,262 LGBT refugees from Iran, Afghanistan and Syria, helping them through their application process at the UNHCR and transition and settlement into Canada, the United States and other countries. The majority are from Iran; however, recently, IRQR has also offered its services to help Afghani and Syrian LGBT refugees.

IRQR has been working with refugees for almost a decade. IRQR helps them in Turkey while they are going through the stages of becoming a Convention Refugee, and meeting with the UNHCR to advocate on their behalf. Without this, many refugees would have been forced to return to Iran.
 
IRQR has maintained a success rate of above 80% in helping refugees through the process. Maintaining success rate above 80% annually is challenging with the significant increase in applicants since 2014, especially because the process time has changed from two to three years.

In 2015, Arsham Parsi traveled to Turkey in February and September. He met with LGBT refugees to document their situation and provide services on the ground. He met with officials at the UNHCR office in Ankara to advocate for the most vulnerable and urgent cases in order to be granted for an expedited process. Because of IRQR work and the UNHCR, many LGBT refugees were granted an earlier interview and received refugee status, meaning they could begin their journey to a new home and being free to be LGBT.

IRQR held five workshops in Denizli and Eskişehir, Turkey, in 2015 to help Iranian LGBT refugees whose cases were in process with the UNHCR.

See also

 LGBT rights in Iran

References

External links
IRQR web site

LGBT political advocacy groups in Canada
LGBT rights in Iran
Queer organizations
Immigration and LGBT topics
Organizations established in 2008